The Telegram is a daily newspaper published weekdays and Saturdays (as The Weekend Telegram) in St. John's, Newfoundland and Labrador, Canada.

History
The Evening Telegram was first published on April 3, 1879 by William James Herder. It adopted its current name in 1998, although it was also briefly published under this name in 1881. Herder and his descendants owned and published The Evening Telegram until it was sold to Thomson Newspapers (now Thomson Corporation) in 1970, and continued as publishers until the departure of Stephen R. Herder (William's Grandson) in 1991.

William Herder began as a printer for the St. John's weekly The Courier. When it folded in 1878, Herder purchased one of the presses and began his own newspaper. The Telegram was notable as the first daily (excluding Sundays) in Newfoundland. It is also the only 19th century Newfoundland newspaper to survive into the 20th (and now 21st) century. Over the course of its history, the paper has published news, stories and editorials of interest to readers in the Dominion/Province of Newfoundland and St. John's in particular. Coverage of the St. John's Great Fire of 1892 was hampered as the Evening Telegram head office on Duckworth Street was completely destroyed in the fire. Despite heavy losses, Herder rebuilt and was published from a temporary location on Water Street less than two months later.

On April 13, 2017, Transcontinental announced that it had sold all of its newspapers in Atlantic Canada to SaltWire Network, a newly formed parent company of The Chronicle Herald.

In April 2021, it was announced by SaltWire that The Telegram'''s standalone website would merge into SaltWire.com effective April 20.

Politics
In the 19th century, The Evening Telegram was known for its strong opinions on issues of the day, including the Newfoundland Railway, and early Confederation discussions. However, its editorial policy remained neutral during the heated Confederation debates of 1948/49. The same could not be said of former Evening Telegram reporter Joey Smallwood, who worked for the paper from 1919 to 1922 (including a short stint as editor in 1923). After his association with The Evening Telegram, Smallwood went on to found the pro-Confederation newspaper The Confederate, lead Newfoundland into confederation with Canada, and become the first premier of the new Province of Newfoundland. As Premier, Smallwood had a rocky relationship with The Telegram, bringing a series of libel suits against it and threatening to withdraw all government advertising.

The paper has not explicitly endorsed candidates during recent general elections. It does not shy away from political criticism, however, and in recent years has been quite critical at various times of both the federal Conservatives under Stephen Harper, and to a lesser extent the provincial Conservatives under Danny Williams. At the same time, it has not expressed any particular confidence in opposing parties such as the Liberals.

Community ties and current status
Well-known former Telegram journalists include Newfoundland writers Harold Horwood, Ray Guy, and Albert Perlin. Other notable contributors to The Telegram include former editor and author Michael Harrington, artist Rae Perlin, former Newfoundland Prime Minister William F. Lloyd and former provincial NDP leader Peter Fenwick. The Telegram is the original publication venue of the monthly church history column by Dr Hans Rollmann.The Telegram has sponsored the Tely 10 10 mile road race annually since 1927, and the provincial men's senior hockey trophy, the Herder Cup, is named for William Herder.The Telegram is Newfoundland and Labrador's largest newspaper, and published seven days a week from 1989 to 2008, when it reverted to a single weekend paper published on Saturday as The Weekend Telegram''. Its tagline is "The People's Paper", accompanied by the provincial flag. The title is printed in Old English Text font.

See also
List of newspapers in Canada

References

 The Telegram: History
 Memorial University Historical Directory of Newfoundland and Labrador Newspapers
 Porter, Stephanie. "Basically, he's still around - William J. Herder founded The Evening Telegram and Started a Dynasty." The Newfoundland and Labrador Independent September 4–10, 2005: 1-2

External links
 

Newspapers published in St. John's, Newfoundland and Labrador
SaltWire Network publications
Daily newspapers published in Newfoundland and Labrador